Just Because I'm a Woman is the second solo studio album by American singer-songwriter Dolly Parton. It was released on April 15, 1968, by RCA Victor. The album was produced by Bob Ferguson. It peaked at number 22 on the Billboard Top Country Albums chart. The album's title track was the only single released and it peaked at number 17 on the Billboard Hot Country Singles chart.

Background
When Parton joined The Porter Wagoner Show in September 1967 she was still signed to Monument Records. In addition to having Parton join his show, Wagoner was instrumental in persuading RCA Victor to sign Parton to a recording contract. Parton's first three sessions for RCA were limited to duets with Wagoner as she could not record for RCA as a solo artist until her contract with Monument expired.

Recording
Recording sessions for the album took place on December 11, 18 and 20, 1967, at RCA Studio B in Nashville, Tennessee.

Content
The title song, in which a woman admonishes her boyfriend for passing judgment on her previous sexual encounters even though he is guilty of the same behavior, was regarded as something of a daring statement to make at the time. It was written by Parton in response to her husband's questioning (and subsequent reaction) if she'd ever been with a man before him. "The Bridge", distinctive because of its subject matter and rather abrupt ending, details the story of a woman who falls in love with a man and becomes pregnant with his child. His abandonment leads the woman back to the bridge where she apparently commits suicide. The last verse states, "My feet are moving slowly, Closer to the edge, Here is where it started, And here is where I'll end it..." before simply ending, midway through the verse.

Parton re-recorded "Just Because I'm a Woman" for the 2003 tribute album Just Because I'm a Woman: Songs of Dolly Parton.

Release and promotion
The album was released April 15, 1968, on LP.

Singles
The album's only single, "Just Because I'm a Woman", was released in May 1968 and debuted at number 46 on the Billboard Hot Country Songs chart dated June 29. It peaked at number 17 on the chart dated September 14, its twelfth week on the chart. The single charted for a total of 14 weeks. It also peaked at number eight in Canada on the RPM County Singles chart.

Critical reception

Billboard reviewed the album in the issue dated April 27, 1968, saying that "Dolly really makes it with this package. Her performances are packed with sincerity and style. The songs include "You're Gonna Be Sorry", "False Eyelashes", "Try Being Lonely", and some more earthy, realistic tunes."

Cashbox published a review of the album which said, "After one duet smash with Porter Wagoner, and another just beginning to make the climb, Dolly Parton makes her first RCA solo flight with this LP. Soaring to some pretty heady heights with a dozen well-chosen tracks, the lark spreads her wings like a veteran, especially on such tracks as "Try Being Lonely" and "You're Gonna Be Sorry", as well as the title track, and can count on some excellent response."

Mark Deming of AllMusic gave the album 4.5 out of 5 stars, calling it "one of Parton's best early albums and a superb showcase for her gifts as both a singer and songwriter." He noted that although there are only four Parton compositions on the album, they are four of the best songs included. He concluded by saying that "the album still sounds like a winner decades after its initial release."

Commercial performance
The album debuted at number 44 on the Billboard Top Country Albums chart dated May 4, 1968. It peaked at number 22 on the charted dated June 15, its seventh week on the chart. The album charted for a total of nine weeks.

Reissues
The album was reissued on CD in 1995 as 2Gether on 1 with Porter Wagoner and Parton's first collaborative studio album, Just Between You and Me. It was reissued in 2003 with new liner notes and two bonus tracks recorded for Parton's 1970 live album A Real Live Dolly, including her first live performance of "Coat of Many Colors".

Track listing

Personnel
Adapted from the album's 2003 CD reissue liner notes.

David Briggs – piano
Jerry Carrigan – drums
Anita Carter – background vocals
Dolores Edgin – background vocals
Bob Ferguson – producer
Lloyd Green – steel guitar
Junior Huskey – bass
Mack Magaha – fiddle
George McCormick – rhythm guitar
Wayne Moss – electric guitar
Al Pachucki – recording engineer
Dolly Parton – lead vocals
Hargus "Pig" Robbins – piano
Charles Trent – electric banjo
Porter Wagoner – liner notes
Chip Young – rhythm guitar

Charts

Release history

References

1968 albums
Albums produced by Bob Ferguson (music)
Dolly Parton albums
RCA Records albums